The National Skating Federation (Ulttyq konkımen júgirýshiler federatsııasy) is the national governing body for skating in Kazakhstan. The organisation was founded in 1992 among local ski clubs. The National Skating Federation represents international interests of the Kazakhstani skiing and trains athletes and trainers. The NSK headquarters are located in Nur-Sultan at the Alau Ice Palace. Current NSK president is Bolat Zhamishev.

External links
 

Skating
International Skating Union
National governing bodies for ice skating
Ice skating in Kazakhstan
Organizations based in Astana
Sports organizations established in 1992